Il ratto delle sabine is an Italian adventure comedy film from 1961, directed by Richard Pottier, written by Edoardo Anton, starring Roger Moore and Jean Marais. The scenario was based on a novel of André Castelot. The film was also known under the title "L'Enlèvement des Sabines" (France), "Il ratto delle sabine" (Italy), "Les femmes de Sabine" (Canada, French title), "Der Raub der Sabinerinnen  " (West Germany), "El rapto de las sabinas" (Spain), "Romulus and the Sabines" (USA), "O Rapto das Sabinas" (Portugal).

Cast 
 Mylène Demongeot: Rea
 Roger Moore: Romulus
 Francis Blanche: Mezio
 Jean Marais: Mars
 Scilla Gabel: Dusia
 Folco Lulli: King Titus Tatius
 Rosanna Schiaffino: Venus 
 Giorgia Moll: Lavinia
 Claude Conty: Tarquinius Albus
 Luisa Mattioli: Silvia
 Marino Masé: Lino
 Walter Barnes: Stilicone
 Nietta Zocchi: Queen Hersilia
 Franco Albina: Lepico
 Petar Dobric: Numa Pompilius
 Dada Gallotti: Flaminia
 Mariangela Giordano: Domizia
 Dina De Santis: Albina

See also 
 The Rape of the Sabine Women

References

External links 
 
 

1961 films
Yugoslav adventure comedy films
1960s adventure comedy films
French adventure comedy films
Italian adventure comedy films
1960s historical comedy films
French historical comedy films
Italian historical comedy films
Yugoslav historical comedy films
Films directed by Richard Pottier
Films scored by Carlo Rustichelli
Films set in ancient Rome
Films based on classical mythology
Films set in the 8th century BC
1960s French-language films
1960s Italian-language films
1960s English-language films
English-language French films
English-language Italian films
English-language Yugoslav films
Cultural depictions of Romulus and Remus
1960s Italian films
1960s French films
French-language Italian films